Fred McIlhattan (September 22, 1944 – June 10, 2020) was a Republican former member of the Pennsylvania House of Representatives, representing the 63rd District from 1997 through 2008.   He and his wife live in Knox, Pennsylvania and have 2 children. He retired prior to the 2008 election and was succeeded by Republican Donna Oberlander. McIlhattan died in 2020 after a heart attack at the age of 75.

References

External links
Pennsylvania House of Representatives - Fred McIlhattan official PA House website
Pennsylvania House Republican Caucus - Representative Fred McIlhattan official Party website
Biography, voting record, and interest group ratings at Project Vote Smart

1944 births
2020 deaths
Republican Party members of the Pennsylvania House of Representatives
People from Butler County, Pennsylvania
People from Clarion County, Pennsylvania
Clarion University of Pennsylvania alumni